Mike Grell (born September 13, 1947) is an American comic book writer and artist, known for his work on books such as Green Lantern/Green Arrow, The Warlord, and Jon Sable Freelance.

Early life
Grell studied at the University of Wisconsin–Green Bay, the Chicago Academy of Fine Art, and took the Famous Artists School correspondence course in cartooning. To avoid getting drafted into Army service during the Vietnam War, he enlisted for four years in the U.S. Air Force, including a stint as illustrator in Saigon. After the Air Force, Grell enrolled in the Chicago Academy of Fine Art, and also worked as a freelance graphics artist.

Career
Grell entered the comics industry as an assistant to Dale Messick on the Brenda Starr comic strip in 1972.

DC Comics
In 1973 Grell moved to New York City, and began his long relationship with DC Comics. At DC, Grell worked on characters such as Aquaman, Batman, Green Arrow, and the Phantom Stranger in arcs or single-issue stories. He and Elliot S. Maggin launched the Batman Family title in 1975 and Grell would work with Dennis O'Neil on the revival of the Green Lantern/Green Arrow series the following year. For a time between 1976 and 1978, Grell was writing and penciling one series, Warlord, and providing pencil art on two others, Green Lantern and Superboy and the Legion of Super-Heroes.

Superboy and the Legion of Super-Heroes
His regular first assignment at DC was on Superboy and the Legion of Super-Heroes, a high-profile assignment for an artist with no prior experience illustrating a monthly comic book. Grell says he got that job because he was walking in the editor's door to ask for work, literally, as the previous artist, Dave Cockrum, was walking out the door, having just quit. Grell inked a Cockrum penciled story ("Lost: A Million Miles from Home!") in issue #202 and became the penciler of the book with issue No. 203 (August 1974) which featured the death of Invisible Kid. These stories were written by Cary Bates with later issues by Jim Shooter. Grell drew All-New Collectors' Edition #C-55 (1978), a treasury-sized special written by Paul Levitz in which longtime Legion members Saturn Girl and Lightning Lad were married.

The Warlord

A writer as well as artist, Grell cemented his status as a fan-favorite with his best-known creation, The Warlord. The character first appeared in 1st Issue Special No. 8 (Nov. 1975) and was soon given his own ongoing title (The Warlord #1, Jan/Feb 1976). In this series, Air Force pilot Travis Morgan crash-lands in the prehistoric "hidden world" of Skartaris (a setting highly influenced by Jules Verne's A Journey to the Center of the Earth and Edgar Rice Burroughs' Pellucidar). For years thereafter, Morgan engages in adventures dressed only in a winged helmet, wristbands, boots, and breechclout, and armed with a sword and a .44 Auto Mag. Grell wrote himself and editor Jack C. Harris into the metafictional conclusion of the story in The Warlord #35 (July 1980). Other artists took over pencil duties, while Sharon Grell, as revealed in the letter column of a later issue, took over writing.

Tarzan
Grell wrote and drew the Tarzan comic strip from July 19, 1981, to February 27, 1983 (except for one strip, February 13, 1983, by Thomas Yeates). These strips were rerun in newspapers in 2004 – 2005.

First Comics: Jon Sable Freelance and Starslayer

Through the 1980s Grell developed creator-owned titles such Jon Sable Freelance and Starslayer. Jon Sable Freelance was published by the now-defunct First Comics. Starslayer, a space-born science fiction series, started at Pacific Comics, but shifted to First after Pacific went out of business.

The titular character of Jon Sable Freelance was a former Olympic athlete, later an African big-game hunter, who became a mercenary. First appearing with a cover date of June 1983, Jon Sable was a precursor to what would eventually be called, by some, "the Dark Age of Comics", when even long-established super-heroes would become increasingly grim and violent.

The character was heavily influenced by Ian Fleming's James Bond novels as well as drawing on pulp fiction crime stories. Many of the stories of Sable's hunting exploits in Africa were influenced by Peter Hathaway Capstick's novels. At a convention in the late 1980s, Grell stated that his idea for Sable was "something like a cross between James Bond and Mickey Spillane's Mike Hammer".

Sable was adapted into a short-lived television series and the character's origin tale, "A Storm Over Eden", from the comic book, was expanded and novelized by Grell under the title Sable, which was published in 2000 by Tor Books.

Back at DC: Green Arrow
In 1987, Mike Grell wrote and drew the three-issue prestige format limited series Green Arrow: The Longbow Hunters. He redesigned the character's costume, away from the costume Neal Adams had designed in 1969, and recast Green Arrow as an "urban hunter" going up against non-super-powered, real world villains such as serial killers, terrorists, street gangs, American mobsters and Japanese Yakuza. He did away with Green Arrow's arsenal of "trick arrows" and instead rearmed him with penetrating broadheads with which he actually killed his opponents. The Longbow Hunters showed the first instance in which Green Arrow ever deliberately killed someone.

The popularity of Longbow Hunters led to an assignment writing – and occasionally drawing – an ongoing Green Arrow series for 80 issues from 1988 to 1993. During this run, Grell avoided references to the fantastical elements of the DC Universe (e.g., in a guest appearance by Green Lantern the character is out of costume and does not use his powers). Notably, believing "Green Arrow" was "a stupid name", in no Mike Grell Green Arrow story (with the exception of Longbow Hunters #1) is the character ever referred to as Green Arrow anywhere other than on the cover. 

Grell would write a retelling of Green Arrow's origin and first case in Secret Origins vol. 2 #38 (March 1989). He was the co-writer/cover artist for Green Arrow Annual (1991), drew the cover art for Annual #5 (1992), and wrote Annual #6 (1993). Grell wrote and illustrated the official Post-Crisis origin of Green Arrow in Green Arrow: The Wonder Year miniseries in 1993. 

In 1988, Grell had a run writing Blackhawk in the short-lived anthology series Action Comics Weekly, writing the Blackhawk serial from issues #601–608.

James Bond
In 1988, Grell wrote and illustrated the graphic novel adaptation of the Timothy Dalton James Bond film Licence to Kill, and in 1989 wrote and drew an original Bond story, the three-issue mini-series Permission to Die, both co-published by Acme Press and Eclipse Comics.

Shaman's Tears and Bar Sinister
Shaman's Tears was a more ecologically themed outing for Grell. Main character Joshua Brand, the son of a half-Sioux father and an Irish mother, as an adult returns to the reservation he ran away from as a child. Discovering he mystically possesses the powers of all animals and the Earth itself, he becomes the protector of the planet. Jon Sable guest starred in issues #5–9 of this 12 issue series (May 1993 – Aug 1995). There was a number 0 issue published in November 1995.

Grell wrote and drew the covers, but did none of the interior artwork, for issues #1–4 of the Shaman's Tears spinoff series Bar Sinister (June – September 1995) from Windjammer, the creator-owned imprint of Valiant Comics. This series followed the adventures of a group of escaped government experimental subjects, animals genetically engineered to human intelligence and, basically, human form, as potential bio-weapons.

During this time period, Grell began work writing and penciling the unfinished and unpublished Shaman's Tears/Turok Dinosaur Hunter cross-over limited series for Valiant Comics. He did co-write the two issue Turok limited series entitled Turok The Hunted, as well as several fill-in issues of the ongoing Turok series.

2000s

From 2002 to 2003, Grell worked on Iron Man. It was during a Grell written story from this period that Tony Stark revealed his secret identity to the world, a development met with mixed fan reaction.

After his work on Iron Man, Grell came back to comics in 2008, providing a variant incentive cover for Action Comics #861, part four of the Superman and the Legion of Super-Heroes story. DC sought variant drawings for this story from artists who had worked on the Legion in the past, such as Steve Lightle, Keith Giffen, and Grell.

Other work includes a new ongoing series of The Warlord launched to coincide with the 35th anniversary. Grell brought the lead character's story to an end and drew some issues. Grell worked for Marvel drawing some stories of X-Men Forever. His last collaboration with DC to date has been the Green Lantern story for the DC Retroactive series, in 2011, where he provided the art.

Grell is rewriting the Jon Sable screenplay, working on an adaptation of Shaman's Tears, and writing two stories for ComicMix.com, a new Jon Sable story and The Pilgrim with Mark Ryan. In December 2010 he was announced as editor-in-chief of Ardden Entertainment.

In 2012, Grell provided the cover art for the 10-page preview comic produced by DC Comics for the 2012 San Diego Comic-Con to promote the TV series Arrow. Grell did interior art for issues #6 and #11 of the digital comic based on the TV series.

Personal life
In the 1980s, Grell was married to Sharon Wright.  She ghost-wrote the last two years of The Warlord, while Grell concentrated his efforts on Starslayer; Jon Sable, Freelance; and the weekly Tarzan Sunday comic strip.

Awards
Mike Grell received an Inkpot Award in 1982.

Bibliography

DC Comics

Action Comics (Atom) #442; (Green Arrow) #440, 441, 444–446, 450–452, 456–458 (1974–76), #601–608 (writer, Blackhawk serial) (1988)
Adventure Comics (Aquaman) #435–437; (Crimson Avenger) #440 (1974–75)
Arrow (digital comic based on the TV series) #6, 11, 16 (2012–13)
All–New Collector's Edition (Legion of Super-Heroes) #C–55 (1978)
The Amazing World of DC Comics #12 (previously unpublished story) (1976)
Batman #287–290 (1977)
Batman Family (Robin and Batgirl) #1 (1975)
DC Super Stars (Green Arrow) #17 (1977)
DC Retroactive: Green Lantern – The '70s #1 (one-shot, 2011)
Detective Comics (Robin) #445; (Batman) #455; (Atom) #463; (Black Canary) #464 (1975–76)
1st Issue Special (Warlord) #8 (1975)
The Flash (Green Lantern backup stories) #237–238, 240–243 (1975–76)
Green Arrow: The Longbow Hunters miniseries #1–3 (1987)
Green Arrow, vol. 2, #1–80, Annual #4, 6 (1988–94)
Green Arrow: The Wonder Year, miniseries, #1–4 (1993)
Green Lantern, vol. 2, (Green Lantern/Green Arrow) #90–100, 106, 108–110 (1976–78)
Legion of Super-Heroes, vol. 3, #45 (four pages only) (1988)
Ms. Tree Quarterly (Batman text story) #1 (1990)
Phantom Stranger, vol. 2, #33 (1974)
Secret Origins, vol. 2, #38 (writer for Green Arrow story only) (March 1989)
Shado: Song of the Dragon, miniseries, #1–4 (1992)
Superboy starring the Legion of Super-Heroes #203–224, 235 (1974–78)
Warlord #1–52, 59, Annual #1 (1976–82)
Warlord, vol. 3, #7–12, 15–16 (2009–10)
Weird War Tales #67 (1978)

Image Comics
Maggie the Cat #1–2 (1996)
Shaman's Tears #1–12, No. 0 (1993–95)
Spawn: The Impaler miniseries #1–3 (1996)

Marvel Comics
Iron Man vol. 3 #50–69 (2002–03)
X-Men Forever Giant-Size No. 1 (2010)
X-Men Forever vol. 2, #9–10 (2010)

Other publishers
Jon Sable Freelance #1–43 (First) (1983–86)
Starslayer #1–6 (Pacific) (1982–83)
ShadowStar #2 (cover art only) (Savage Graphics) (1985)

Collected editions 
Legion of Super-Heroes Archives
Volume 10 includes Superboy # 202; 232 pages, October 2000, 
Volume 11 collects Superboy #203–212; 224 pages, August 2001, 
Volume 12 collects Superboy #212–223; 240 pages, May 2003, 
Volume 13 includes Superboy #224; 240 pages, May 2012,

References

External links

 
Mike Grell at Mike's Amazing World of Comics
Mike Grell at the Unofficial Handbook of Marvel Comics Creators

1947 births
American comics artists
American comics writers
Comic book editors
Inkpot Award winners
Living people
School of the Art Institute of Chicago alumni
University of Wisconsin–Green Bay alumni